The Jacobs Institute for Design Innovation is a building on the campus of UC Berkeley, part of the UC Berkeley College of Engineering. Construction began in August 2014 with a $20 million gift from the Paul and Stacy Jacobs Foundation. The ribbon-cutting ceremony took place on August 20, 2015, with speeches from various UC Berkeley administrators, Ellen Lupton, Paul E. Jacobs, executive chairman of Qualcomm, and the building opened for instruction on September 16. The 24,000-square-foot building was constructed at a cost of $25 million, funded by philanthropy.

Facilities 

The building includes a general purpose makerspace on the first floor, two classrooms on the second floor, and a large classroom and event space on the third floor. The makerspace contains tools and rapid prototyping equipment.

 Metal shop
 Visualization lab
 CAD/CAM lab
 All-purpose makerspace
 Design lounge
 Electronics lab
 AV production lab
 Advanced prototyping lab

Masters in Design program 

On June 25, 2019 it was announced that the institute would play a key role in developing and delivering the core curriculum for the new Master of Design program with the inaugural cohort in 2020.

References

External links
 Institute homepage
 Berkeley MDes website
 Design at Berkeley

University of California, Berkeley buildings